The Cal 35 is an American sailboat that was designed by C. William Lapworth as a cruiser and first built in 1979.

The Cal 35 is sometimes confused with the earlier Cal 35 Cruise series of sailboats.

Production
The design was built by Cal Yachts in the United States, but it is now out of production.

Design
The Cal 35 is a recreational keelboat, built predominantly of fiberglass sandwich construction, with wood trim. It has a masthead sloop rig with aluminium spars, a raked stem, a reverse transom, an internally mounted spade-type rudder controlled by a wheel and a fixed fin keel. It displaces  and carries  of ballast.

Ventilation consists of four opening ports in the main cabin, plus two in the bow cabin. There is a dorade vent over the head. There are also four fixed ports in the main cabin, plus fixed, flush-mounted deadlights over the galley and the forward berths.

The mainsail is sheeted to a mainsheet traveler on the cabin roof. The genoa is sheeted to tracks and is controlled with two-speed winches. There are two halyard winches. The mainsail boom has a topping lift and two internal reefs, an internal outhaul and a boom vang with a 4:1 mechanical advantage.

The design has a PHRF racing average handicap of 136.

Variants
Cal 35 Mark I
This model was introduced in 1979. It has an interior with the head (with a shower) located on the port side at the bottom of the companionway steps. The galley is located aft. Sleeping accommodation is located forward.
Cal 35 Mark II
This model was introduced in 1981. It has revised interior, with the head located forward on the starboard side, just aft of the bow "V"-berth. The galley is on he port side and includes a three-burner alcohol-fired stove and an oven. An aft double berth on the starboard side was optional.

See also
List of sailing boat types

Similar sailboats
C&C 34/36
C&C 35
Express 35
Goderich 35
Hughes 36
Hughes-Columbia 36
Hunter 35 Legend
Hunter 35.5 Legend
Island Packet 35
Landfall 35
Mirage 35
Pilot 35

References

Keelboats
1970s sailboat type designs
Sailing yachts
Sailboat type designs by Bill Lapworth
Sailboat types built by Cal Yachts